Pheidole moerens is an ant, a species of higher myrmicine in the family Formicidae.

Subspecies
These two subspecies belong to the species Pheidole moerens:
 Pheidole moerens creola Wheeler & Mann, 1914 i c g
 Pheidole moerens moerens Wheeler, 1908 i c g
Data sources: i = ITIS, c = Catalogue of Life, g = GBIF, b = Bugguide.net

References

Further reading

External links

 

moerens
Articles created by Qbugbot
Insects described in 1908